Patricia Jünger (born 6 August 1951) is a Swiss-Austrian multi-media artist, conductor, sound director and composer.

Biography
Jünger was born during an airplane trip from Dublin to Vienna, at a stop in Frankfurt am Main and has Swiss and Austrian citizenship. Jünger studied piano, organ, composition and directing in Frankfurt am Main, Vienna and Paris. She completed her studies in 1977 and then became a full-time composer. Recently she has leaned toward more electroacoustic works.

Honours and awards
 Theodor Körner Prize for Composition, 1979
 Vienna Cultural Foundation Prize, 1979
 Scholarship from the Viennese Alban Berg Foundation, 1980
 Scholarship from Basel's Paul Sacher Foundation, 1980
 Bursary for composition by the Austrian state, 1981 and 1983
 Sabbatical year for composition, canton of Aargau, 1983
 Karl Sczuka Prize from SWF Baden-Baden, 1986, for the radio play 'Sehr geehrter Herr - ein Requiem'

Works
Selected works include:
 Sehr geehrter Herr - ein Requiem, radio play (1986)
 Transmitter
 Valse éternelle – ein Brief, radio play
 Muttertagsfeier, oder Die Zerstückelung des weiblichen Körpers (1984)
 Erziehung eines Vampirs, radio play (1986)
 Die Klavierspielerin, opera (1988)

Selected recordings
Jünger's works have been recorded and issued on CD, including:
 Patricia Jünger: Eva Csapo, Collegium Musicum Zürich, Musiques Suisses (CD, 2006), ASIN: B000J10K4Q
 Die Klavierspielerin (Der Audio Verlag, September 2005), 
 Bright Light, for mezzo-soprano, clarinet, drums and orchestra (MGB, DDD, 1989)

References

External links 
 

1951 births
20th-century classical composers
20th-century women composers
21st-century classical composers
21st-century women composers
Austrian classical composers
Women classical composers
Living people
Swiss classical composers
20th-century Swiss composers
21st-century Swiss composers